Daniel Donche Jr. is an American author, screenwriter, actor, artist, and game designer. He also publishes under the pseudonym Janden Hale. He has written two novels, numerous short stories, and a post-apocalyptic series called Everwind. He was also one of the cofounders of Manarchy Magazine.
As an artist, Donche is known mostly for his award-nominated tarot deck, the Darkana Tarot, and  Inappropriate Tarot Readings, a collection of satirical tarot posts that appear throughout several social media outlets. Following the launch of Inappropriate Tarot on Facebook, he designed and produced all the art for the Darkana tarot deck, which won two awards and was voted as one of the "Top 50 Essential Tarot Decks" by a group of over 13,000 members. He is also the creator of the HexCam and Octavum camouflage patterns.

Life
Daniel Donche Jr. was born in Columbia, South Carolina. He graduated from Natrona County High School in Casper, Wyoming in 1998. He joined the US Air Force in 2002, where he became a member of a Tactical Air Control Party.

Bibliography

Published Novels and Novellas
Snowleaf (Everwind Series, 2012) 
Legion of Liberty (Everwind Series, 2012) 
The Facility (Everwind Series, 2012) 
Locker 6T3:A Punk Story (2004)
Jester's Down  (2003)

Published Short Stories
Smallerhouse - Slit Your Wrists!, November 2012
Gift of the Rook - Solarcide, September 2012
Terminal - Thunderdome Magazine, December 2011 
Sterling Road - Thunderdome Magazine, October 2011 
I, Jack - Nefarious Muse, September 2011
Tampon - Red Fez, Issue 21 
Revision - Why Vandalism?, February 2007 
The Severence - Cherry Bleeds, Issue 123 
Blue - Thieves Jargon, February 2005 
Randy - Cherry Bleeds, Issue 122 
The Guy Who Ate His Sister - Swill Magazine, Issue 1 
The Search for the Haunted Skatepark - Automatic Magazine, Issue 36

Other works
Paper Walls - illustrated poems and quotes

Darkana Tarot
The Darkana Tarot, is a post-modern grunge tarot deck that was heavily influenced by the art of Banksy which is known for its departure from the traditional tarot. It was the subject of a collection of themed short stories on Thunderdome Magazine from June–July 2012. It won the 2012 Pecto Award for Outstanding First Work of an Illustrator. and won the Tarosophists Award for best self-published tarot deck of 2012. The deck has been voted as one of the "Top 50 Essential Tarot Decks" by a group of over 13,000 people.

Film
He has been involved in a number of unfinished film projects as both a screenwriter and actor - Proxy Influence, Dark Matter, Legacy of One - and he also had a brief extra role as a Lieutenant Garcia in the veteran-made film Range 15.

Interviews
Slit Your Wrists! eZine 
Books and Booze 
Solarcide 
Curiouser and Curiouser 
Personal Tarot Radio Episode #20 
Talking with Ed and Victoria

External sources

References

External links
Official Website
Official Everwind Site

1979 births
Living people
21st-century American novelists
American artists
Writers from Columbia, South Carolina
People from Casper, Wyoming
United States Air Force airmen
American male novelists
Tarot readers
American male short story writers
American critics of Islam
21st-century American short story writers
21st-century American male writers
Novelists from South Carolina